The enzyme polyneuridine-aldehyde esterase (EC 3.1.1.78) catalyzes the following reaction:

polyneuridine aldehyde + H2O  16-epivellosimine + CO2 + methanol

This enzyme participates in indole and ipecac alkaloid biosynthesis.

Nomenclature 

This enzyme belongs to the family of hydrolases, specifically those acting on carboxylic ester bonds.  The systematic name is polyneuridine aldehyde hydrolase (decarboxylating). Other names in common use include:
 polyneuridine aldehyde esterase 
 PNAE

Homologues 
This enzyme is found in various forms in plant species such as Arabidopsis thaliana, Glycine max (soybean), Vitis vinifera (wine grape), and Solanum lycopersicum (tomato) among others.

Polyneuridine-aldehyde esterase also appears in select bacteria including Enterobacter cloacae.

Structure 
The secondary structure of this enzyme consists mainly of α helices. In its native form, this enzyme has a tertiary structure that includes two main lobes (as depicted above in the blue 3D representation on the top right).

Reaction 

Polyneuridine-aldehyde esterase catalyzes the hydrolysis of the methyl ester in polyneuridine aldehyde to form polyneuridine β-aldehydoacid and methanol. The carboxylic acid in the product spontaneously undergoes decarboxylation, yielding 16-epivellosimine and carbon dioxide.

Mechanism 

The mechanism of hydrolysis performed by polyneuridine-aldehyde esterase is not known. It has been suggested that the enzyme utilizes a catalytic triad composed of Ser-87, Asp-216 and His-244. The catalytic amino acid order is the same as the order of enzymes that are part of the α/β hydrolase family. Thus polyneuridine-aldehyde esterase may be a novel member of the α/β hydrolase group.

Broader significance
This enzyme is a part of the pathway of indole alkaloid biosynthesis. The indole alkaloids that result from this metabolic pathway are used by many plant species as a defense against herbivores and parasites.

Open questions 
The precise mechanisms by which this enzyme performs its function is still unknown. As noted above, researchers are formulating suggestions as to how polyneuridine-aldehyde esterase catalyses the decomposition of polyneuridine-aldehyde, but a mechanism has not yet been affirmed with absolute certainty. Due to the lack of complete understanding of polyneuridine-aldehyde esterase's precise mechanism, this enzyme cannot be grouped into a family of enzymes. Based on mechanism theories, suggestions can be made as to how this enzyme should be categorized, and some parallels can be drawn between polyneuridine-aldehyde esterase and other enzymes.

References

Further reading 

 

EC 3.1.1
Enzymes of unknown structure